Elaphriella diplax is a species of sea snail, a marine gastropod mollusk in the family Solariellidae. It is endemic to New Zealand.

Description
The diameter of the shell is up to 11 mm in width. The shell is white in appearance, is moderately thick, and is wider than it is high. This species is regarded as being distinctive in appearance as it has

Distribution
This marine species is endemic to New Zealand and occurs off Mayor Island at depths between 753 m and 826 m.

References

External links 
 Image of the holotype specimen held at Museum of New Zealand Te Papa Tongarewa

Solariellidae
Gastropods of New Zealand
Gastropods described in 1999
Endemic fauna of New Zealand
Endemic molluscs of New Zealand